Australia competed at the 1952 Summer Olympics in Helsinki, Finland. 81 competitors, 71 men and 10 women, took part in 67 events in 12 sports.  Australian athletes have competed in every Summer Olympic Games. As the country hosted the next Olympics in Melbourne, an Australian segment was performed at the closing ceremony.

Medalists

Gold
 Marjorie Jackson-Nelson — Athletics, Women's 100 metres
 Marjorie Jackson-Nelson — Athletics, Women's 200 metres
 Shirley Strickland — Athletics, Women's 80m Hurdles
 Russell Mockridge — Cycling, Men's 1000m Time Trial
 Lionel Cox and Russell Mockridge — Cycling, Men's 2000m Tandem
 John Davies — Swimming, Men's 200m Breaststroke

Silver
 Lionel Cox — Cycling, Men's 1000m Sprint (Scratch)
 Mervyn Wood — Rowing, Men's Single Sculls

Bronze
 Shirley Strickland — Athletics, Women's 100 metres
 David Anderson, Phil Cayzer, Ernest Chapman, Tom Chessel, Mervyn Finlay, Nimrod Greenwood, Edward Pain, Bob Tinning, and Geoff Willamson — Rowing, Men's Eights
 Vern Barberis — Weightlifting, Men's Lightweight

Athletics

Men
Track & road events

Field events

Combined events – Decathlon

Women
Track & road events

Field events

Boxing

Cycling

Road races
Individual times added to together for team race, 3 times needed for team event.

Track 
Ranks given are within the heat.

Diving

Men

Fencing

Six fencers, four men and two women, represented Australia in 1952.

Men

Women

Modern pentathlon

One male pentathlete represented Australia in 1952.

Rowing

Men

Sailing

Swimming

Men

Women

Water polo

Australia failed to advance to the pool stage after losing both qualifiers.

Roster

 Qualifying

Weightlifting

Wrestling

Men's freestyle

References

Nations at the 1952 Summer Olympics
1952
Olympics